The Cassowary Coast Region is a local government area in the Far North Queensland region of Queensland, Australia, south of Cairns and centred on the towns of Innisfail, Cardwell and Tully. It was created in 2008 from a merger of the Shire of Cardwell and the Shire of Johnstone.

The Regional Council, which administers the Region, has an estimated operating budget of A$64 million.

History 
Prior to the 2008 amalgamation, the Cassowary Coast Region consisted of the entire area of two previous local government areas:

Shire of Cardwell
Shire of Johnstone

The Hinchinbrook Division was created on 11 November 1879 as one of 74 divisions around Queensland under the Divisional Boards Act 1879. On 28 October 1881, the Johnstone Division split away from it. On 18 January 1884, the Cardwell Division also split away. With the passage of the Local Authorities Act 1902, both Cardwell and Johnstone became shires on 31 March 1903.

In July 2007, the Local Government Reform Commission released its report and recommended that Cardwell and Johnstone merge. Cardwell was in particular opposed because Johnstone was rated as "financially distressed" and its council had just been sacked by the state government. On 15 March 2008, the two shires formally ceased to exist, and elections were held on the same day to elect six councillors and a mayor to the Regional Council.

Mayors 

 2008–2016: Bill Shannon 
 2016–2020: John Kremastos 
2020–present: Timothy Mark Nolan

Wards and councillors
Although the commission recommended the council be undivided with six councillors and a mayor, the gazetted form was that of six divisions each electing a single councillor, plus a mayor.

Those elected in April 2016 were:

 Mayor: John Kremastos
 Division 1 councillor: Glenn Raleigh
 Division 2 councillor: Rick Taylor
 Division 3 councillor: Wayne Kimberley
 Division 4 councillor: Mark Nolan
 Division 5 councillor: Jeff Baines
 Division 6 councillor: Ben Heath

Towns and localities
The Cassowary Coast Region includes the following settlements:

Greater Innisfail area:
 Innisfail
 Belvedere
 Cullinane
 Eaton
 East Innisfail
 Eubenangee1
 Goondi
 Goondi Bend
 Goondi Hill
 Hudson
 Innisfail Estate
 Jubilee Heights
 Mighell
 Palmerston2
 Ngatjan1
 South Innisfail
 Sundown
 Webb
 Wooroonooran3
Greater Tully area:
 Tully
 Birkalla
 Dingo Pocket
 Silky Oak

Cardwell area:
 Cardwell
 Carruchan
 Bilyana
 Bulgun
 Cardstone
 Carmoo
 Coquette Point
 Damper Creek
 Djiru
 East Feluga
 Ellerbeck
 Euramo
 Feluga
 Hull Heads
 Jarra Creek
 Jumbun
 Kennedy
 Lower Tully
 Lumholtz
 Merryburn
 Midgenoo
 Murray Upper
 Murrigal
 Rockingham
 South Mission Beach
 Tam O'Shanter
 Tully Heads
 Walter Hill
 Wongaling Beach

Johnstone area:
 Basilisk
 Bingil Bay
 Camp Creek
 Comoon Loop
 Coconuts
 Coorumba
 Cowley
 Daradgee
 East Palmerston
 El Arish
 Etty Bay
 Fitzgerald Creek
 Flying Fish Point
 Garners Beach
 Garradunga
 Germantown
 Gulngai
 Japoonvale
 Kurrimine Beach
 Maria Creeks
 Mena Creek
 Midgeree Bar
 Mission Beach
 Moresby
 Mourilyan
 Mourilyan Harbour
 Mundoo
 New Harbourline
 Silkwood
 South Johnstone
 Vasa Views
 Wangan

1 - shared with Cairns Region2 - shared with Tablelands Region3 - shared with Cairns Region and Tablelands Region

Libraries 
The Cassowary Coast Regional Council operate public libraries in Cardwell, Tully (Dorothy Jones Library), Innisfail and Wongaling Beach.

Population
The total population recorded at each census before the foundation of the Cassowary Coast Region combines the population of its component entities prior to their amalgamation in 2008. Its population was officially recorded for the first time in the 2011 Census.

Heritage places
As part of preparing the Cassowary Coast Planning Scheme 2014, the council consulted with the region's heritage groups to compile a list of local heritage places.

References

External links
 2008 Election results – Mayoral
 2008 Election results – Councillors
 University of Queensland: Queensland Places: Cassowary Coast Regional Council
 

 
Local government areas of Queensland
Far North Queensland
2008 establishments in Australia